Jadaan Tarjam Al-Shammari (born 1952) is a Qatari sports shooter. He competed at the 1984 Summer Olympics and the 1988 Summer Olympics.

References

1952 births
Living people
Qatari male sport shooters
Olympic shooters of Qatar
Shooters at the 1984 Summer Olympics
Shooters at the 1988 Summer Olympics
Place of birth missing (living people)